Polyalthia lancilimba is a species of plant in the Annonaceae family. It is endemic to China.

References

Flora of China
lancilimba
Critically endangered plants
Taxonomy articles created by Polbot